Sankaranarayanarkoil is a town and a municipality in the Tenkasi district of the Indian state of Tamil Nadu, India

The main temple of the town is the Sankara Narayanan Temple.

References

Hindu temples in Tirunelveli district
Cities and towns in Tirunelveli district